Sambo is a town and commune of Angola, in the province of Huambo.

See also 

 Communes of Angola

External links
Google Earth view

References 

Populated places in Angola